Johan Reichman (13 May 1879 Tarvastu Parish (now Viljandi Parish), Kreis Fellin – 5 March 1942 Sevurallag, Sverdlovsk Oblast, Russian SFSR) was an Estonian politician. He was a member of II Riigikogu. On 15 October 1923, he resigned his position and he was replaced by Jaan Soots.

References

1879 births
1942 deaths
People from Viljandi Parish
People from Kreis Fellin
Farmers' Assemblies politicians
Members of the Riigikogu, 1923–1926
Estonian people who died in Soviet detention
People who died in the Gulag